Ptychopetalum is a genus of flowering plants in the family Olacaceae, native to the Amazon rainforest. Indigenous name for the genus include marapuama, muirapuama and mirantã, translating roughly to 'potency wood'. The inflorescences consist of short axillary racemes of four to six flowers each. The root is strongly tough and fibrous, internally light brown with thin bark and broad wood, has a faint odor, and tastes slightly saline and acrid.

Species
Ptychopetalum anceps Oliv.
Ptychopetalum olacoides Benth.
Ptychopetalum petiolatum Oliv.
Ptychopetalum uncinatum Anselmino

Uses

Ptychopetalum olacoides has been studied for treatment of dark pigmentation around the eyes. The root and bark are used for a variety of ailments by indigenous peoples in the Rio Negro area of South America, but the effectiveness of muira puama preparations are unproven.

References

Olacaceae
Medicinal plants
Santalales genera